Events from the year 1809 in Ireland.

Events
October – completion of the Military Road across the Wicklow Mountains.
21 October – Nelson's Pillar opened in Sackville Street, Dublin.
The first Roman Catholic Magdalene asylum in Ireland is opened in Cork.

Arts and literature

Jonah Barrington's Historic Anecdotes and Secret Memoirs of the Legislative Union between Great Britain and Ireland is published.
Edward Bunting's A General Collection of the Ancient Music of Ireland is published.

Births
1 May – Samuel Blackall, soldier, politician and second Governor of Queensland, Australia (died 1871).
James Duffy, author and publisher (died 1871).

Deaths
8 October – Arthur Gore, 2nd Earl of Arran, politician (born 1734).

References

 
Years of the 19th century in Ireland
1800s in Ireland
Ireland
 Ireland